Long Berayang is a village in Krayan District, Nunukan Regency in North Kalimantan.

Climate
Long Berayang has a Subtropical highland climate with mild weather year-round and heavy rainfall.

References

Populated places in North Kalimantan